The 1993 Scott Tournament of Hearts Canadian women's national curling championship, was played February 27 to March 6 at the Keystone Centre in Brandon, Manitoba.

Teams

Standings

Results

Draw 1

Draw 2

Draw 3

Draw 4

Draw 5

Draw 6

Draw 7

Draw 8

Draw 9

Draw 10

Draw 11

Draw 12

Draw 13

Draw 14

Draw 15

Draw 16

Draw 17

Playoffs

Semi-final

Final
Saskatchewan wins in an extra end after Peterson (Schmirler) hits a Manitoba rock biting the rings and rolls into the house.

References

Scotties Tournament of Hearts
Scott Tournament of Hearts
Curling competitions in Brandon, Manitoba
1993 in Manitoba
1993 in women's curling
February 1993 sports events in Canada
March 1993 sports events in Canada